Uee (born 1988) is a South Korean singer and actress.

UEE may also refer to:
United All-England Eleven, an English cricket team formed in 1852
Queenstown Airport (Tasmania) IATA code